John Pettigrew may refer to:

 John Pettigrew (footballer) (1934–2014), Australian soccer player
 John Pettigrew (businessman) (born 1968), British businessman
 John Pettigrew (politician) (1832–1878), politician in Queensland, Australia
 Jack Pettigrew (John Douglas Pettigrew, born 1943), professor of physiology